Mount Curwood, elevation 1,978 feet (603 m), in L'Anse Township, Baraga County is the second highest point in the U.S. state of Michigan.  Mt. Curwood is a part of the Huron Mountains range.

External links 
 

Landforms of Baraga County, Michigan
Curwood